"My Ship" is a popular song written for the 1941 Broadway musical Lady in the Dark, with music by Kurt Weill and lyrics by Ira Gershwin.

The music is marked "Andante espressivo"; Gershwin describes it as "orchestrated by Kurt to sound sweet and simple at times, mysterious and menacing at other".

It was premiered by Gertrude Lawrence in the role of Liza Elliott, the editor of a fashion magazine. In the context of the show, the song comes in a sequence in which Elliott, in psychoanalysis, recalls a turn-of-the-century song she knew in her childhood.

The song was not included in the 1944 Hollywood film Lady in the Dark, a fact which Ira Gershwin found inexplicable:

 

In 2003, Herbie Hancock won the Grammy Award for Best Jazz Instrumental Solo for a version of this song released on the album Directions in Music: Live at Massey Hall.

Cover versions
Artists who have recorded the song include (in alphabetical order):
 Ernestine Anderson – The Toast of the Nation's Critics (1958)
 Dorothy Ashby – Soft Winds (1961)
 Cindy Blackman – Works on Canvas (1999)
 Jane Ira Bloom – Sixteen Sunsets (2013)
 Betty Buckley – An Evening at Carnegie Hall (1996)
 Dee Dee Bridgewater – This Is New (Verve, 2002), Midnight Sun (Decca, 2011)
 Ron Carter – Peg Leg (Milestone, 1978)
 June Christy – Duet (with Stan Kenton) (1955), Ballads for Night People (1959)
 Rosemary Clooney – Show Tunes (Concord, 1989)
 Jacqui Dankworth – As the Sun Shines Down on Me (2002)
 Miles Davis with Gil Evans – Miles Ahead (Columbia, 1957)
 Steve Davis – Eloquence (2010)
 Doris Day – I Have Dreamed (1961)
 Judy Garland (1953)
 Herbie Hancock, Michael Brecker, Roy Hargrove – Directions in Music: Live at Massey Hall (2002)
 Johnny Hartman – The Voice That Is! (1964), Hartman for Lovers (2010)
 Caroline Henderson – Lonely House (2013)
 Wynton Kelly – Undiluted (1965)
 Roland Kirk – I Talk with the Spirits (1964)
 Ute Lemper
 Carmen Lundy – Self Portrait (JVC, 1996)
 Doretta Morrow
 Liza Minnelli – 
 Hugh Masekela – Almost Like Being in Jazz (Chissa, 2005) 
 Jessye Norman – Lucky to be me (Philips, 1992)
 Oscar Peterson and Nelson Riddle – Oscar Peterson and Nelson Riddle (Verve, 1963)
 Flora Purim - Perpetual Emotion (Narada, 2001)
 Sonny Rollins – The Standard Sonny Rollins (RCA Victor, 1964)
 Helen Schneider
 George Shearing – My Ship (MPS, 1975)
 Jeri Southern – When Your Heart's on Fire (1957), The Very Thought of You: the Decca Years 1951–1957  (1999)
 Cal Tjader – Soul Burst (1966)
 Dawn Upshaw – I Wish It So (Nonesuch, 1994)
 Cedar Walton – Cedar! (Prestige, 1967)
Dionne Warwick - On Stage And In The Movies (Scepter, 1967)
 Larry Willis – This Time the Dream's on Me (HighNote, 2012)
 Cassandra Wilson and Jacky Terrasson – Rendezvous (1997)
 Nancy Wilson – Broadway – My Way (1964)

A few notes of the song are sung in a Sesame Street cartoon sequence promoting the letter R from the show's premiere 1969–70 season.

References

Further reading
 
 McClung, Bruce (2007). Lady in the Dark, Biography of a Musical. Oxford University Press. 

Songs with lyrics by Ira Gershwin
Songs with music by Kurt Weill
Nancy Wilson (jazz singer) songs
1941 songs